

Oviši Lighthouse (Latvian: Ovišu bāka) — a lighthouse located in , Latvia near Tārgale on the Courland Peninsula coast of the Baltic Sea.

History 
The lighthouse is the oldest functioning lighthouse in Latvia; the village was once a settlement of plunderers which made false signal-fires to rob seamen on stranded ships and steal their goods. The locality, on historic maps, is known as Lusesort or Lyserort. The name originates from the Swedish word lysa, meaning to burn; ort meaning cape. When the lighthouse was built in the nineteenth century, it was used as a navigational aid, with its walls more than half a metre thick. The lighthouse is 33 metres in height, built as a double-cylindrical structure, with a  storage building westward of the lighthouse. Currently the base of the lighthouse houses a museum based on the history of Latvia's lighthouses.

See also

 List of lighthouses in Latvia

References

Lighthouses completed in 1814
Resort architecture in Latvia
Lighthouses in Latvia
Ventspils Municipality